Great Battle Fullblast (グレイトバトル フルブラスト) is a Beat'em up game, developed by Inti Creates and published by Bandai Namco Games, which was released in Japan in 2012 and is part of the Compati Hero Series. The game feature a crossover between Ultraman, Kamen Rider and Gundam; all heroes appearances are in SD (Small Chibi) size.

Gameplay
In this game the player gained assist attack from each series. The assist attack will either help the player or heal the player.

List Of Character

Playable Character

Assist Characters

Enemy

Vakishim
Alien Baltan II
Alien Empera
Tyrant
Daishocker
Greed
Zaku II
Shadow Moon

References

2012 video games
Crossover beat 'em ups
Gundam video games
Ultra Series video games
Kamen Rider video games
Inti Creates games
Japan-exclusive video games
PlayStation Portable games
PlayStation Portable-only games
Video games developed in Japan